The 2016 USA Sevens (also sometimes referred to as the 2016 Las Vegas Sevens) is the thirteenth edition of the USA Sevens tournament, and the fifth tournament of the 2015–16 World Rugby Sevens Series. The tournament was played on 4–6 March 2016 at Sam Boyd Stadium in Las Vegas, Nevada. This was the first time a World Rugby Sevens Series event was contested on artificial turf.

Format
Sixteen teams are drawn into four pools of four teams each. Each team plays everyone in their pool one time. The top two teams from each pool advance to the Cup/Plate brackets. The bottom two teams from each group go to the Bowl/Shield brackets.

Teams
The 16 participating teams for the tournament:

Pool stages

Pool A

Pool B

Pool C

Pool D

Knockout stage

Shield

Bowl

Plate

Cup

References

2016
Sports competitions in Las Vegas
USA Sevens
USA Sevens
USA Sevens
2016 rugby sevens competitions